Hickman or Hickmann is a surname, and may refer to:

Hickman

Acting
Alfred Hickman (1873–1931), English actor
Amy-Leigh Hickman (born 1997), English actress
Bill Hickman (1921–1986), American stunt driver, stunt coordinator, and actor
Darryl Hickman (born 1931), American actor and television executive, brother of Dwayne
Dwayne Hickman (1934–2022), American actor and television executive, brother of Darryl
Howard Hickman (1880–1949), American actor, director and writer

Military
John Hickman (sailor) (1837–1904), American Civil War sailor and Medal of Honor recipient
Paschal Hickman (c. 1778 – 1813), American officer killed in the War of 1812
Thomas Hickman-Windsor, 1st Earl of Plymouth (c. 1627 – 1687), English peer and military figure

Music
Art Hickman (1886–1930), American bandleader and jazz pioneer
John Hickman (musician) (1942–2021), American banjo player
Sara Hickman (born 1963), American singer, songwriter, and artist

Politics
Albert Edgar Hickman (1875–1943), Canadian politician
Alex Hickman (1925–2016), Canadian lawyer, politician and judge
David Henry Hickman (1821–1869), American legislator and businessman in Missouri
John Hickman (Pennsylvania politician) (1810–1875), American congressman in Pennsylvania
John W. Hickman (born 1939), American politician in Utah
Richard Hickman (1757–1832), American politician in Kentucky
Russell O. Hickman (1908–1988), American politician in Maryland

Religion
Charles Hickman (1648–1713), Church of Ireland bishop
Henry Hickman (died 1692), English minister and controversialist

Sports
Bernard "Peck" Hickman (1911–2000), American college basketball coach at Louisville
Charlie Hickman (1876–1934), American professional baseball player
James Hickman (born 1976), English swimmer
Jim Hickman (1910s outfielder) (1892–1958), American professional baseball player
Jim Hickman (1960s outfielder) (1937–2016), American professional baseball player
Jim Hickman (racing driver) (1943–1982), American racecar driver
Mark Hickman (born 1973), Australian field hockey goalkeeper
Ricky Hickman (born 1985), American-Georgian basketball player
Ronnie Hickman (born 2001), American football player

Writing and journalism
Clayton Hickman (born 1977), British science fiction author
Fred Hickman (1956–2022), American sports broadcaster
Jonathan Hickman (born 1972), American comic book writer and artist
Leo Hickman, English journalist
Martha Whitmore Hickman (1925–2015), American author
Stephen Hickman (1949–2021), American artist, illustrator, sculptor, and author
Tracy Hickman (born 1955), American fantasy author

Scientists and inventors 
Clarence James Hickman (1914–1980), British-Canadian mycologist
Clarence N. Hickman (1889–1981), American physicist
Ron Hickman (1932–2011), South African-born, Jersey-based automobile designer and inventor
Vernon Victor Hickman (1894–1984), Australian entomologist, specialising in spiders
W. Albert Hickman (1878–1957), Canadian boat designer and builder
W. Braddock Hickman (1911–1970), American economist and president of the Federal Reserve Bank of Cleveland

Other
Alfred Hickman (disambiguation), several people
David Hickman (disambiguation), several people
Henry Hickman (disambiguation), several people
Jay Hickman (disambiguation), several people
Jim Hickman (disambiguation), several people
John Hickman (disambiguation), several people
Wild Bill Hickman (1815–1883), American frontiersman
William Edward Hickman (1908–1928), American murderer

Hickmann 
Ana Hickmann (born 1981), Brazilian model and television host
Anton Leo Hickmann (1834–1906), Bohemian-born Austrian geographer
Fons Hickmann (born 1986), German graphic designer
Hans Hickmann (1908–1968), German musicologist
Hugo Hickmann (1877–1955), German politician

See also
Hickman (disambiguation)
Hickam (disambiguation)

English-language surnames